Cysteine-rich with EGF-like domain protein 1 is a protein that in humans is encoded by the CRELD1 gene.

Function 

Epidermal growth factor (EGF)-like repeats are a class of cysteine-rich domains that mediate interactions between proteins of diverse function. EGF domains are found in proteins that are either completely secreted or have transmembrane regions that tether the protein to the cell surface. CRELD1 is the founding member of a family of matricellular proteins.

References

External links

Further reading